The Chairman of the Central Inspection Commission of the Communist Party of Vietnam is the man responsible for the fight against corruption and indiscipline within the party.

Officeholders

Notes

References

Bibliography

  
 

Central Committee of the Communist Party of Vietnam
Lists of political office-holders in Vietnam